The following events occurred in December 1960:

December 1, 1960 (Thursday)
The Congolese Army arrested Patrice Lumumba, deposed premier of the Congo, while he was on his way to Stanleyville to meet his supporters. Lumumba would be moved around the country and then shot to death on January 17, 1961.
The Soviet Union launched Sputnik 6, a 5-ton satellite, into orbit with two dogs, Pchelka ("Little Bee") and Mushka ("Little Fly"), plus mice, insects and plants. The next day, the capsule was reported to have burned up on re-entry into the atmosphere at too steep an angle. According to later reports, a self-destruct system had been built to destroy the satellite if it did not re-enter at the correct time, in order to prevent it from landing outside the Soviet Union.
A  recovery whip antenna replaced the balloon-borne system on the Mercury spacecraft.
McDonnell completed the fabrication of the first Mercury spacecraft orbital timing device, and qualification tests for this component were started immediately.

December 2, 1960 (Friday)
The Most Rev. Geoffrey Francis Fisher, Archbishop of Canterbury and leader of the Anglican Church, talked with Pope John XXIII for about an hour at the Vatican, marking the first time since 1397 that England's highest ranking religious leader had visited the Pope.
U.S. President Dwight D. Eisenhower authorized the use of $1M for the relief and resettlement of Cuban refugees, who had been arriving in Florida at the rate of 1,000 a week.
Spacecraft weight and balance values for the Mercury-Redstone 2 (MR-2) mission were forwarded by the Space Task Group to the Marshall Space Flight Center.

December 3, 1960 (Saturday)
Redstone launch vehicle No. 3 was shipped to Cape Canaveral for the Mercury-Redstone 1A (MR-1A) mission.
Camelot, the most expensive theatrical production to that time, made its Broadway debut, at the Majestic Theatre, with Richard Burton as King Arthur and Julie Andrews as Lady Guinevere.
Born: 
Daryl Hannah, American film actress, in Chicago 
Igor Larionov, Russian ice hockey player who, in 1989, became the first Soviet player to join the NHL; in Voskresensk 
Julianne Moore, American actress, in Fort Bragg, North Carolina

December 4, 1960 (Sunday)
The Islamic Republic of Mauritania had applied to be the 100th member of the United Nations, but the request was vetoed in the Security Council by the Soviet Union, on grounds that Mongolia had been denied admission.  In 1961, Sierra Leone would become the 100th member, followed by Mongolia and Mauritania.
Born: Glynis Nunn, Australian heptathlete, and 1984 Olympic gold medalist; in Toowoomba, Queensland

December 5, 1960 (Monday)
In the case of Boynton v. Virginia, the U.S. Supreme Court declared, by a 7 to 2 vote, that a law requiring permitting bus stations to exclude patrons on the basis of race, was unconstitutional under the Equal Protection Clause. The case had arisen when a law student at Howard University, Bruce Boynton, was fined for refusing to leave a "whites only" restaurant at the Trailways bus terminal in Richmond, Virginia.
Born: Sarika, Indian film actress (as Sarika Thakur), in New Delhi

December 6, 1960 (Tuesday)
U.S. Secretary of the Interior Fred A. Seaton issued Public Land Order 2214, reserving  of land as the Arctic National Wildlife Refuge.
Public Land Order 2216 established the  Izembek National Wildlife Range, which included Izembek Lagoon and its entire watershed near the tip of the Alaska Peninsula as "a refuge, breeding ground, and management area for all forms of wildlife."

December 7, 1960 (Wednesday)
The United Nations Security Council was called into session by the Soviet Union, to consider Soviet demands that the U.N. seek the immediate release of former Congolese Premier Patrice Lumumba.  
The QH-50 DASH (Drone Anti-Submarine Helicopter), a drone that could be guided by remote control, made its first successful unmanned landing, descending upon the USS Hazelwood.
At the request of the government of Dade County, Florida, the U.S. government opened the first federal Cuban Refugee Center, located in Miami, with a staff of 14. By the end of 1961, the center had 300 employees. 
Died: Clara Haskil, 65, Romanian classical pianist

December 8, 1960 (Thursday)
Hayato Ikeda began his second term as Prime Minister of Japan.
The North Dakota Agricultural College was officially renamed North Dakota State University

December 9, 1960 (Friday)
French President Charles de Gaulle's visit to French Algeria was marked by bloody European and Muslim mob riots in Algeria's largest cities, resulting in 127 deaths.
The first episode of the long-running ITV drama Coronation Street aired in Britain. It was originally planned to be a 16-part drama but became such a success that, running five times or more per week, it continued past its 10,000th episode in its 60th anniversary year.
Spacecraft No. 7 was delivered to Cape Canaveral for the Mercury-Redstone 3 (MR-3) crewed ballistic mission (Shepard).
Entrepreneur Tom Monaghan and his brother James took over the operation of "DomiNick's Pizza" store at 301 West Cross Street in Ypsilanti, Michigan. In 1965, after the original owner declined to allow the use of his name for other locations, Tom Monaghan renamed his restaurant Domino's Pizza.

Died: Hyperion, 30, British thoroughbred racehorse who won the British Triple Crown (2,000 Guineas Stakes, Epsom Derby and St Leger Stakes) in 1943 and later a champion sire.

December 10, 1960 (Saturday)
The first underwater park within the United States, the John Pennekamp Coral Reef State Park, was formally dedicated.
Born: Kenneth Branagh, Northern Irish actor and film director, in Belfast

December 11, 1960 (Sunday)
Richard Paul Pavlick, a 73-year-old postal clerk from New Hampshire, loaded his car with dynamite and then parked outside the Kennedy family estate in Palm Beach, Florida, and prepared to kill President-elect John F. Kennedy, waiting for Kennedy to depart for Sunday mass.  Pavlick changed his mind after seeing that Kennedy was accompanied by his wife and two small children.  Pavlick was arrested four days later by Palm Beach city police.

December 12, 1960 (Monday)
The most commonly used Spanish-language version of the Holy Bible, the 1960 revision of the Reina-Valera, was released.  The original version had been published in 1569.  A more recent, but not as popular, revision was released in 1995.

December 13, 1960 (Tuesday)
In the U.S. presidential election, the Texas board of canvassers awarded all 24 of that state's disputed electoral votes to Democratic Party candidate John F. Kennedy, bringing his total from 249 to 273, three more than the 270 required to win.  The decision came two hours after federal judge Ben C. Connally rejected a Republican lawsuit seeking a recount.  
While Emperor Haile Selassie I of Ethiopia was visiting Brazil, his Imperial Bodyguard staged a coup d'etat, taking many of the Imperial staff hostage, including Crown Prince Asfa Wossen, who was proclaimed as King (rather than Emperor).  The coup failed within a few days, and Haile Selassie reigned as emperor until another coup in 1975.
Guatemala, El Salvador, Nicaragua and Honduras founded Sistema de la Integración Centroamericana (SICA), the Central American Integration System, often called the Central American Common Market.
Commander Leroy A. Heath and his navigator, Lt. Henry L. Monroe (Bombardier/Navigator), established a new world record for highest altitude attained in an airplane, reaching 91,450.8 feet (27,874.2 m) in an A3J Vigilante. 
Died: 
Isaac Foot, 80, British lawyer and politician 
John Charles Thomas, 69, American operatic baritone

December 14, 1960 (Wednesday)
The first "Tied Test" in the history of Test cricket took place at the end of the match in Brisbane between the West Indies and Australia. At the end of the First Innings on December 10, Australia had a 505–453 lead. In the Second Innings, however, the West Indies had outscored Australia 284 to 232. When Australia's last batter, Lindsay Kline, came up for the 7th and final ball, the score had closed to 737 to 737. Kline hit the ball bowled by Wes Hall, and Ian Meckiff dashed toward the wicket for what would have been the winning run, but Joe Solomon fielded the ball and hit the stumps for the last out. "Until today," Percy Beames wrote in Melbourne's newspaper The Age, "there had not been a tie in Test cricket."
In Stanleyville, Congo, Antoine Gizenga proclaimed himself to be the successor to Patrice Lumumba. For four months, Gizenga's forces controlled the Orientale and Kivu provinces, called Free Republic of the Congo, but on April 17, he surrendered in return for a post as a vice premier in the central government.
The Organisation for Economic Co-operation and Development (OECD) was created by the signing of an international convention by 18 European nations and the United States and Canada.
By a vote of 89–0, the UN General Assembly Resolution 1514, the "Declaration on the Granting of Independence to Colonial Countries and Peoples" was adopted by the UN member nations. The United States, the United Kingdom, Australia, France, and five other nations abstained.
A contract with the Waltham Precision Instrument Company for the development of a satellite clock was canceled. Technical difficulties were encountered in the manufacturing of the device, previously scheduled for delivery in August 1960, and there was little assurance that these problems could be resolved in time for the clock to be used in any of the Project Mercury flights. McDonnell fabricated an orbital timing device, which proved to be very satisfactory.
The five-member electoral board of Illinois, with a majority of Republican members, unanimously certified the results of the November 6 popular balloting in the U.S. presidential election and awarded Democrat John F. Kennedy the state's 27 electoral votes. The board had considered Republican charges of voter fraud in Cook County and denied a request for a further election recount. Before the award of the Illinois block, Kennedy had 273, three more than the necessary 270 needed to win.

December 15, 1960 (Thursday)
After a 19-month experiment in democracy, King Mahendra of Nepal deposed the elected government and restored the absolute monarchy, based on Panchayat system.
In a royal wedding at the St. Michael and St. Gudula Cathedral in Brussels, King Baudouin of Belgium married Doña Fabiola de Mora y Aragon.  Earlier in the day, the two had married in a private civil ceremony at the royal palace.
Died: Seyum Mangasha, Ethiopian prince and military commander, was killed by rebels during an attempted military coup against the Emperor's government

December 16, 1960 (Friday)
In the collision of two airliners over New York City, 136 people were killed, including eight people on the ground who were struck by falling debris.  United Airlines Flight 826 from Chicago, with 77 passengers and seven crew, was outside its designated holding pattern for circling New York's Idlewild Airport, and collided with TWA Flight 266  over Staten Island at 10:37am.  The United DC-8 jet crashed in Brooklyn at the intersection of 7th Avenue and Sterling Place.  Stephen Baltz, 11, was pulled conscious from the wreckage, but died the next day.  The TWA plane, a Lockheed Super-Constellation with 39 passengers and five crew, had been on its way from Columbus, Ohio, to New York's La Guardia airport, and crashed on a vacant area at the Miller Field U.S. Army base on Staten Island.  In addition to the 128 passengers and crew on both planes, eight more people on the streets of Brooklyn were killed by the falling debris.

December 17, 1960 (Saturday)
At 2:10 in the afternoon, a U.S. Air Force plane crashed into a crowded street in Munich, West Germany, killing 32 people on the ground and all 20 people on board the airplane. The plane, whose 13 passengers were American college students returning home, lost power after takeoff and clipped the steeple at the St. Paul's Church, then fell onto a streetcar on Martin Greif Straße, near the intersection with Bayerstraße. 
Died: Abebe Aregai, 57, Prime Minister of Ethiopia, killed by machine-gun fire as the army stormed the Genetta Leul palace where he was being held hostage by rebels.

December 18, 1960 (Sunday)
The National Museum of India was opened in New Delhi.
Born: Léhady Soglo, Beninese politician, in Paris

December 19, 1960 (Monday)
Representatives of twelve African nations that had formerly been colonies of France met in Brazzaville in the Republic of Congo and agreed to form an international organization. The African and Malagasy Union, consisting of Cameroon, the Central African Republic, Chad, the Republic of the Congo ("Congo-Brazzaville"), Côte d'Ivoire, Dahomey (now Benin), Gabon, Madagascar, Mauritania, Niger, Senegal and Upper Volta (now Burkina Faso) came into existence on September 12, 1961.
Fire swept through the USS Constellation, the largest U.S. aircraft carrier, while it was under construction at a Brooklyn Navy Yard pier, killing 46 and injuring 150.
John F. Kennedy was elected as the 35th President of the United States, as the 534 people who had been selected (on November 8) to serve in the Electoral College, met in their respective states' capitals. Democratic candidate Kennedy received 300 votes, 31 more than the 269 needed to win, and Republican challenger Richard M. Nixon had 219.  U.S. Senator Harry F. Byrd received 15 votes, from all 8 of Mississippi's slate of unpledged electors (a ticket which finished ahead of Kennedy and Nixon), six from Alabama pledged to Kennedy, and one from Oklahoma pledged to Nixon. Hawaii's 3 electors had not been certified, pending a recount of the popular vote, but were awarded to Kennedy prior to the January 6, 1961, tabulation.
Mercury-Redstone 1A (MR-1A) was launched from Cape Canaveral in a repeat of the November 21, 1960, mission (Mercury-Redstone 1) and was completely successful. This was the third attempt to accomplish the objectives established for this flight. The first attempt on November 7, 1960, was canceled as a result of a helium leak in the spacecraft reaction control system relief valve, and on November 21, 1960, the mission could not be completed because of premature cut-off of the launch vehicle engines. Objectives of the MR-1A flight were to qualify the spacecraft for spaceflight and to qualify the flight system for a primate flight scheduled shortly thereafter. Close attention was given to the spacecraft-launch vehicle combination as it went through the various flight sequences: powered flight; acceleration and deceleration; performance of the posigrade rockets; performance of the recovery system; performance of the launch, tracking, and recovery phases of the operation; other events of the flight including retrorocket operation in a space environment; and operation of instrumentation. Except that the launch vehicle cut-off velocity was slightly higher than normal, all flight sequences were satisfactory; tower separation, spacecraft separation, spacecraft turnaround, retrofire, retropackage jettison, and landing system operation occurred or were controlled as planned. Fifteen minutes after landing in the Atlantic Ocean, the recovery helicopter picked up the spacecraft to complete the successful flight mission.

December 20, 1960 (Tuesday)
Major Richard Baer, commandant of the Auschwitz concentration camp, was arrested after 15 years on the run. Baer had been posing as "Karl Neuman", a gardener on the estate of Otto Von Bismarck, since 1945.
The National Liberation Front (NLF) was created as a Communist political organization in South Vietnam, to oppose the government of President Ngo Dinh Diem, who gave the group the nickname "Viet Cong". As the NLF gained adherents, it began carrying out military attacks against the South Vietnamese Army, and against U.S. forces during the Vietnam War.
Redstone launch vehicle No. 2 was delivered to Cape Canaveral for the Mercury-Redstone 2 (MR-2) mission (chimpanzee "Ham" flight).
Born: Pedro Abrunhosa, Portuguese singer-songwriter, in Oporto

December 21, 1960 (Wednesday)
Eileen Derbyshire, 30, first played the role of Emily Bishop on the British soap opera Coronation Street. She would portray the character for more than fifty years.

December 22, 1960 (Thursday)
The Vostok-K rocket made its maiden flight, carrying a satellite with two dogs, Kometa and Shutka.  An attempt to put the payload into orbit failed when the third stage failed seven minutes into launch, but the dogs survived the landing.
John F. Kennedy resigned from his position as the junior United States senator for Massachusetts, in preparation of his January 20 inauguration as President of the United States.
Born:  
Tyrell Biggs, American heavyweight boxer, in Philadelphia 
Luther Campbell, American rapper (2 Live Crew), in Miami
Died: Sir Ninian Comper, 96, Scottish architect

December 23, 1960 (Friday)
After the news came out that Israel was building a nuclear reactor (with assistance from France), Egypt's President Gamal Abdel Nasser warned in a nationwide speech that the United Arab Republic would go to war "if we become sure that Israel is building an atom bomb".  Nasser added "We shall take every step in order to preserve our country and to destroy our enemy."  Nasser later pledged to send Egypts army to destroy the Dimona Nuclear Centre. 
Born: Miyuki Miyabe, Japanese author, in Tokyo

December 24, 1960 (Saturday)
The Boston Celtics set an NBA record for most rebounds by a team, in a 150–106 win over the visiting Detroit Pistons.  Only 2,046 people turned out to Boston Garden to watch the Christmas Eve game.
Born: Carol Vorderman, English television presenter, in Bedford

December 25, 1960 (Sunday)
Earthquakes of this size are fairly common in Victoria.

December 26, 1960 (Monday)
The Philadelphia Eagles defeated the Green Bay Packers, 17–13, to win the 1960 NFL championship.  The AFL title game, between the Houston Oilers and the Los Angeles Chargers, would not take place until New Year's Day 1961.  
Born: Andrew Graham-Dixon, English art historian, in London
Died: Tetsuro Watsuji, 71, Japanese philosopher

December 27, 1960 (Tuesday)
After being forced to leave West Germany, The Beatles made a triumphant return to Liverpool, playing at the ballroom at the Litherland Town Hall. Author Hunter Davies, who wrote the authorized biography of the band, commented that "If it is possible to say that any date was the watershed, this was it.  All their development, all their new sounds and new songs, suddenly hit Liverpool that evening.  From then on, as far as a devoted fanatical following was concerned, they never looked back."

December 28, 1960 (Wednesday)
Rebels in the Congo attacked a train that was transporting 300 passengers from Elisabethville to their homes in Katanga Province, many of them schoolchildren and their mothers.  Although the train was guarded by UN soldiers from Sweden, it was besieged by hundreds of Baluba tribesmen at Luena, then again at Bukima.  At least 20 passengers were killed, and others raped and kidnapped.
Yakov Zarobyan became first secretary of the Communist Party of Armenia.
Born: Dev Benegal, Indian film director, in New Delhi.

December 29, 1960 (Thursday)
A former U.S. Defense Department employee was arrested by the FBI after taking almost 200 classified documents from the Weapons Systems Evaluation Group division at the Pentagon.  Arthur Rogers Roddey, a mathematician who had top secret clearance, was sentenced to eight years in prison on March 22, 1961.
Born:  
David Boon, Australian cricketer, in Launceston, Tasmania
Dave Pelzer, American author, in Daly City, California

December 30, 1960 (Friday)
The Third Test match of the series between India and Pakistan began at Eden Gardens, Calcutta.
Born: Katoucha Niane, Guinean-born French model, in Conakry (drowned 2008)
Died: Angelo Donati, 75, Italian banker, philanthropist and diplomat known for saving thousands of French Jews from extermination during World War II

December 31, 1960 (Saturday)
After 12 years, compulsory national service came to an end in the United Kingdom. After the National Service Act 1948 took effect, men aged 17 to 21 could be drafted into the armed forces for an 18-month tour, followed by four years reserved duty. 
In the tiny principality of Andorra, Francesc Cairat (Francisco Cayrat) retired after five terms and 15 years as the First Syndic, the chief executive officer as selected by the General Council for a term of three years.  He was succeeded by Julià Reig Ribó, who would serve two terms, ending in 1966.  The nominal co-princes of Andorra at the time were Ramon Iglesias i Navarri (Spain's Bishop of Urgel) and Charles de Gaulle (President of France).
Born: John Allen Muhammad, American spree killer who killed 10 people in the Beltway sniper attacks in 2002; in Baton Rouge, Louisiana (executed 2009)

References

1960
1960-12
1960-12